Badger State may refer to:

 Wisconsin, United States
, one of two ships

See also
Badger State Games, biannual, amateur athletic event in Wasau
Badger State Shoe Company building, historic building in Madison
Badger State Trail, 40-mile footpath in south-central Wisconsin